Devdatta Nage (born 5 February 1977) is an Indian actor. He gained fame after playing role of Lord Khandoba in the  Zee Marathi serial Jai Malhar.

Personal life 
Nage is from Alibag of Raigad district, Maharashtra, India. He lives in Mumbai, Maharashtra, India. He married Kanchan Nage.

Career 
He made his debut on television with Colors TV’s serial “Veer Shivaji” in which he played the role of Tanaji Malusare. He was also seen in Colors TV’s “Laagi Tujhse Lagan”.

He is seen in Star Pravah’s popular serial “Devyani” in which he played the role of Samratrao Vikhe Patil. He is best known for Zee Marathi’s popular serial “Jai Malhar” in which he played the role of Lord Khandoba. He is also appeared in other Marathi serials like "Mrutyunjay Karnachi Amargatha",  "Kalay Tasmay Namah", "Bajirao Mastani".  His commercial play is “Ek Mau Char Bhau”.

He made his debut in Marathi film industry through film “Sangharsh” in 2014. His Bollywood film debut was “Once Upon a Time in Mumbai Dobaara” in 2013 and “Satyameva Jayate” in 2018. In 2020, he appeared in bollywood film “Tanhaji: The Unsung Warrior” in which he played the role of Suryaji Malusare.

He is making comeback on the small screen after 2 years with the serial “Dr. Don” which is aired on Zee Yuva channel. Currently, he is roped in for playing the role of Hanuman in Om Raut's upcoming film "Adipurush".

Filmography

Films

Television

Awards and nominations

References

External links 
 

1981 births
Living people
21st-century Indian male actors
Male actors in Marathi television